Akès da Costa Goore (born 31 December 1984) is an Ivorian former professional footballer who played as a defender.

Club career
Goore began his career at RFC Daoukro, before moving to Ivory Coast club ASEC Mimosas in 2003. He played with ASEC Mimosas for five years.

In 2010 Goore signed a contract with Russia club FC Luch-Energia Vladivostok in January 2008. After half a year and fifteen games, he left Luch-Energia Vladivostok, and signed in August of the same year a contract with FC Moscow.

On 12 March 2015, Goore signed for Narva Trans.

International career
Goore represented Ivory Coast U-20 at the 2003 FIFA World Youth Championship.

Career statistics

Club

References

External links
 Profile at FIFA.com
 Russian Premier League Squads & Stats 2008

1984 births
Living people
Ivorian footballers
Association football defenders
Ivory Coast under-20 international footballers
Russian Premier League players
Meistriliiga players
ASEC Mimosas players
FC Luch Vladivostok players
FC Moscow players
FC Spartak Vladikavkaz players
JK Narva Trans players
Ivorian expatriate footballers
Ivorian expatriate sportspeople in Russia
Expatriate footballers in Russia
Ivorian expatriate sportspeople in Estonia
Expatriate footballers in Estonia